There are over sixty churches in Cyprus with Byzantine and post-Byzantine wall paintings. Of these, ten that are situated in the Troodos Mountains have been inscribed jointly on the UNESCO World Heritage List as the Painted Churches in the Troodos Region.

History

The origins of Christianity on the island may be traced to the visit of St. Paul, St. Barnabas and St. Mark around AD 46. After the fall of the western Roman Empire, Cyprus came under the sway of Byzantium, although the timely discovery of Barnabas' relics helped the Church of Cyprus uphold its autocephaly. The crusader Kingdom of Cyprus outlived the Fall of Constantinople by a generation; the subsequent sale of the island to Venice led to a brief period of Italo-Byzantine painting. In 1571 Cyprus fell to the Ottomans and the practice of ecclesiastic wall painting largely came to an end.

Organization of space
Subject to the layout of each church, the iconographic schema typically accords with the classic Byzantine tripartition, evident also in Byzantine mosaic decoration, the three zones comprising: (1) the dome and conch of the apse; (2) the pendentives, squinches and upper vaults; and (3) the lower, secondary vaults and walls. The first is reserved for depictions of the holiest persons, the Christ Pantokrator and the Virgin; the second for scenes from the Life of Christ and the festival cycle; and the third for the choir of intercessory saints.

Preservation
Since the Turkish invasion of Cyprus in 1974, a number of churches in the north have been looted and their wall paintings detached to supply the international antiquities trade. Among them is the Church of St. Evphemianos in Lysi: the thirteenth-century Christ Pantocrator mural and surrounding angels were detached, leaving their feet behind; the paintings were then acquired for the Menil Collection and displayed at the Byzantine Fresco Chapel in Houston, Texas before their repatriation to the south in 2012. Meanwhile, many churches in the south been the subject of conservation interventions, conducted by the Department of Antiquities, Dumbarton Oaks and the Courtauld Institute of Art, aimed at reconciling the competing demands of stability, legibility and authenticity within the framework of ongoing devotional practice.

Churches

See also
 Byzantine art
 Dionysius of Fourna
 Orthodox church architecture
 Painted Churches in the Troödos Region
 Hague Convention for the Protection of Cultural Property in the Event of Armed Conflict

References

External links
 Department of Antiquities: Monuments

Churches in Cyprus
Historic sites in Cyprus
Painted
Byzantine art
Cyprus